Periploca devia is a moth in the family Cosmopterigidae. It was described by Ronald W. Hodges in 1969. It is found in North America, where it has been recorded from Arizona to California.

The wingspan is 8–10 mm. The head, thorax and forewings are shining gray black. The hindwings are yellowish white, becoming slightly darker distally. Adults have been recorded on wing in July.

References

Moths described in 1969
Chrysopeleiinae
Moths of North America
Taxa named by Ronald W. Hodges